Sturgeon Bay is an arm of Green Bay extending southeastward approximately 10 miles into the Door Peninsula at the city of Sturgeon Bay, located approximately halfway up the Door Peninsula. The bay is connected to Lake Michigan by the Sturgeon Bay Ship Canal. The Potawatomi name for Sturgeon Bay is "Na-ma-we-qui-tong".

Origin 
The bay seems to represent the pre-glacial path of the Menominee River, with the valley deepened by glacial carving and then submerged into rising lakewaters.

Bridges 
Three bridges cross the bay, including the historic Sturgeon Bay Bridge, and the recently finished Oregon Street Bridge.

Fish 
Sturgeon Bay and Little Sturgeon (just to the south of Sturgeon Bay) are considered biodiversity hotspots because they support a large number of different fish species.

Researchers collected viral hemorrhagic septicemia viruses from 184 different fish from 2003 to 2017. Two were found from 2007–2010 infecting smallmouth bass within Sturgeon Bay. Each of them was a different variant of a type not found in the middle or lower Great Lakes.

Mayflies 
In June 2016, an estimated several thousand mayflies hatched in Sawyer Bay (within Sturgeon Bay). This was the result of an experiment to stock millions of eggs from the species Hexagenia limbata and Hexagenia bilineata in the lower Green Bay area in an attempt to reintroduce the species. The last mayfly from the genus Hexagenia had been collected in the lower Green Bay area in 1955. As mayfly populations can be unstable and not all stocking locations appeared to be successful, as of 2017 it was not yet known whether it would be possible for populations of Hexagenia mayflies to become self-sustaining.

Climate

Gallery

Notes

Bays of Wisconsin
Bodies of water of Door County, Wisconsin
Bays of Lake Michigan